Sunny is a 2011 studio album by Towa Tei. It peaked at number 23 on the Oricon Albums Chart.

Track listing

Charts

References

External links
 

2011 albums
Towa Tei albums